Hurricane Isaac was a strong tropical cyclone that affected Newfoundland in early October 2006. Isaac was the tenth and final tropical cyclone and fifth hurricane of the 2006 Atlantic hurricane season. Isaac originated in a tropical wave that entered the Atlantic Ocean on September 18. The depression was upgraded to a tropical storm just 12 hours later, though unfavorable atmospheric conditions, including high wind shear and cool water temperatures, initially inhibited further intensification. Isaac ultimately peaked as a Category 1 hurricane on the Saffir-Simpson Hurricane Scale, and brushed Newfoundland as a tropical storm. Effects from the storm were minimal and limited to gusty winds, rough surf, and sporadic rainfall.

Meteorological history

A tropical wave emerged from the western coast of Africa and entered the Atlantic Ocean on September 18, 2006. On September 23, an associated area of disturbed weather began to exhibit indications of organization; in response, Dvorak classifications were initiated. Influenced by moderate to strong wind shear, the system moved west-northwestward for several days. Once environmental conditions became more favorable for tropical cyclone development, the storm had sufficiently organized to be designated a tropical depression on September 27. Despite being upgraded, deep convection had not wrapped around the entire center of circulation. Although the depression was approaching tropical storm status by later on September 27, wind shear continued to affect the cyclone. On September 28—about 12 hours after the storm's formation—it became the tenth tropical storm of the 2006 Atlantic hurricane season, and received the name Isaac.

Initially, the storm was tracking towards the northwest, between another low pressure system to its west and a low- to mid-level ridge to its east. Throughout the day, thunderstorm activity remained unstable, possibly as a result of cooler waters churned up by previous storms. In addition, mid- to upper-level dry air had become entrained into the circulation, and the storm contained some subtropical characteristics with a baroclinic-type cloud pattern. By early September 29, Isaac had slowed and turned towards the west. Convection began to intensify and consolidate later that day; outflow had also improved, and became more symmetric in nature. Moving into warmer waters, Isaac continued to strengthen, and attained hurricane status on September 30. However, this period of intensification was short-lived, and the cyclone reached its peak intensity with winds of 85 mph (140 km/h) at around 0000 UTC on October 1. Around that time, a ragged eye feature appeared on satellite imagery.

"A fairly well-defined hurricane", Isaac began to recurve around the periphery of a subtropical ridge while accelerating in forward speed. While tracking towards the north-northeast, the storm began to gradually weaken as a result of increasing southwesterly wind shear and colder sea surface temperatures. At about 1200 UTC on September 2, Isaac was downgraded to a tropical storm. After passing Newfoundland Isaac transitioned into an extratropical storm, and subsequently merged with a larger storm on October 3.

Preparations and impact

A tropical storm watch was issued in response to Isaac on October 1 for the Avalon Peninsula. The watch was upgraded to a tropical storm warning the next day, while a separate watch was posted for the Burin and Bonavista peninsulas, though it was quickly discontinued. By 2100 UTC on October 2, all tropical cyclone watches and warnings were lifted. Heavy rainfall and gusty winds were expected, prompting the issuance of rainfall warnings for parts of southeastern Newfoundland, while wind and gale advisories were declared offshore.

Two other ships, several buoys, and several oil platforms also recorded tropical storm-force winds. Waves offshore reached  in height.

Impacts on land were generally insignificant; no damages or fatalities were reported. However, parts of the Avalon Peninsula experienced tropical storm conditions. The most intense winds remained offshore.

See also

 List of Atlantic hurricanes
 Timeline of the 2006 Atlantic hurricane season
 List of Canada hurricanes
 Other storms of the same name

References

External links

 The NHC's archive on Hurricane Isaac
 The CHC's archive on Hurricane Isaac

2006 Atlantic hurricane season
Hurricanes in Canada
Category 1 Atlantic hurricanes
Isaac